Jacques Debeur (6 December 1936 – 23 July 2004) was a Belgian fencer. He competed at the 1956 and 1960 Summer Olympics.

References

1936 births
2004 deaths
Belgian male fencers
Belgian épée fencers
Belgian foil fencers
Olympic fencers of Belgium
Fencers at the 1956 Summer Olympics
Fencers at the 1960 Summer Olympics